The 50 calibre BL 6 inch gun Mark XXIII was the main battery gun used on the Royal Navy and British Commonwealth's conventional (non-anti-aircraft) light cruisers built from 1930 through the Second World War, and passed into service with several other navies when ships were disposed of after the end of the War.

Description

The gun replaced the BL 8 inch Mk VIII naval gun used on earlier Washington Naval Treaty cruisers.  These built-up guns consisted of a tube and 4.5-metre jacket with a hand-operated Welin breech block.  Cloth bags contained 14 kg (30 pound) charges of cordite or flashless (NQFP) powder for a 51 kg (112-pound) projectile.  Useful life of a barrel was 1,100 effective full charges (EFC) with standard cordite and 2,200 EFC with NQFP. The typical maximum rate of fire was eight rounds per gun, per minute. There were three mountings: the two-gun Mk XXI, the three-gun Mk XXII and the three-gun Mk XXIII.  Depending on the mount elevation limits differed.  The Mk XXI turret elevation limits were +60 degrees to −5 degrees, and the Mk XXII turret elevation limits were +45 degrees to −5 degrees.  Loading could be accomplished at any angle up to +12.5 degrees, although the preferred loading angle was between +7 and +5 degrees for all three mounts. The Mk XXI and XXII mounts used a "short trunk" ammunition hoist while the Mk XXIII used a "long trunk" ammunition hoist system, which reduced the crew requirements and increased the speed of the hoists. A RN gunnery officer on HMS Bermuda gave details of the loading cycle which could be attained in the Mk XXIII turret with a well trained crew: "...a loading cycle of four and a half to 5 seconds was attained at low elevation, another two to three seconds being required with the guns elevated for long range. The time would lengthen as fatigue set in, but was creditable..."

Ships mounting BL 6 inch Mk XXIII guns

Shell trajectory

Ammunition

See also

Weapons of comparable role, performance and era
 15 cm SK C/25: German equivalent light cruiser gun, operating at higher velocity
 15 cm SK C/28: approximate German equivalent
 152 mm /55 Italian naval gun Models 1934 and 1936: Italian equivalent operating at higher velocity
 15.5 cm/60 3rd Year Type: slightly larger Japanese equivalent
 6"/47 caliber Mark 16 gun: US equivalent light cruiser gun

Surviving examples
 12 guns and four turrets are preserved on the museum ship  in London, UK
 A number of Mark XXIIIs can also be found at English Heritage or other historical sites being used to represent earlier marks which were used as coastal artillery. Tilbury Fort, Essex, has one barrel; Coalhouse Fort, East Tilbury, Essex has two barrels; Gravesend, Kent, has one barrel; the Tynemouth gun emplacement has one barrel.
 One is on display at The Historic Dockyard Chatham, Kent, England. It is at the head of No.3 Dry Dock. Royal Navy 6" breech-loading Mk.XXIIIL WWII cruiser gun and the barrel is on 6" P Mk.XI (or P. XII. REGD. No 15) proof mounting as used at Proof and Experimental Establishment (P&EE), Shoeburyness, Essex, 1948-87.

Notes

References

Bibliography

External links

Tony DiGiulian, Britain 6"/50 (15.2 cm) BL Mark XXIII

Naval guns of the United Kingdom
152 mm artillery
World War II naval weapons of the United Kingdom
Military equipment introduced in the 1930s